Senator Cohen may refer to:

Dick Cohen (born 1949), Minnesota State Senate
John S. Cohen (1870–1935), U.S. Senator from Georgia
Steve Cohen (born 1949), Tennessee State Senate
William Cohen (born 1940), U.S. Senator from Maine